Semerah was a federal constituency in Johor, Malaysia, that was represented in the Dewan Rakyat from 1974 to 1986.

The federal constituency was created in the 1974 redistribution and was mandated to return a single member to the Dewan Rakyat under the first past the post voting system.

History
It was abolished in 1986 when it was redistributed.

Representation history

State constituency

Election results

References

Defunct Johor federal constituencies